Casalini (founded in 1939 by Giovanni Casalini) is an Italian company that makes mopeds and microcars. Casalini S.R.l. is the oldest microcar producer in the world. The factory is situated in Piacenza.

The current range of Casalini microcars have bodies made of reinforced fiber glass plastic.

History 
The factory produced three-wheelers and moped bikes up until the late 1960s. The first microcar left the factory in 1969. The Sulky, which at that time was a three-wheel vehicle, was unusual in its class for having a steel monocoque body. It was mostly made for people without a driving license and had an engine with less than 50 cc (a 49.6 cc Vespa TL3 engine). There was also a 125-cc version. This car was also exported to France, where it was sold by the local Lambretta distributor as the Willam Sulky. A four-wheeled model with a slightly longer body was also developed, for export only. This was called the Willam Lambretta and also had 49 cc and 125 cc engine options; the larger-engined version has rectangular headlamps rather than round. The Sulky/Bretta have rear-wheel-drive and coil springs, the Bretta with wishbone front suspension. More than 10,000 units of the first Sulky were produced.

From 1994, when Italy accepted the European directive 92/61, Casalini S.r.l. began to produce light quadricycles for sale in Italy as well, starting with the Kore 500. The technical and aesthetic evolution of this vehicle was called Sulkydea (1996), Ydea (2000), Sulkydea LV (2004), and Sulky (2008). Over the past few years, the production of two transport and leisure time vehicles have been added: Kerry and Pickup. In 2010, the M10 was presented, a four-wheel vehicle also available in a sporty "Daytona" version.

Two other connected companies supply Casalini S.r.l. in the production of Sulky, Kerry, and Sulky Pickup: Mech-Plant S.r.l., that deal with metallic composition, and Target S.r.l., that deal with plastic/ABS (acrylonitrile butadiene styrene) material. The Sulky (now M10), Kerry, and Pickup all contain a steel frame treated against corrosion and a composite material body. The car has large glass door surfaces and disc brakes front and rear and a speed limitation of 45 km/h (28 mph) for safety. Casalini S.r.l. is present in all markets of the European Union.

External links

 Official website of Casalini Srl

References

Car manufacturers of Italy
Microcars
Quadricycles
Moped manufacturers